Zavalla is a city in Angelina County, Texas, United States. The population was 603 at the 2020 census. The town is named for Lorenzo de Zavala, a Mexican rancher, politician, and signer of the Texas Declaration of Independence who served as the first Vice-President of the Republic of Texas. Its city limits stretch several miles south of town into a heavily wooded area.

Demographics

As of the 2020 United States census, there were 603 people, 257 households, and 191 families residing in the city.

As of the census of 2000, there were 647 people, 268 households, and 176 families residing in the city. The population density was 306.6 people per square mile (118.4/km2). There were 340 housing units at an average density of 161.1 per square mile (62.2/km2). The racial makeup of the city was 97.68% White, 0.46% Native American, 0.15% Asian, 0.62% from other races, and 1.08% from two or more races. Hispanic or Latino of any race were 2.01% of the population.

There were 268 households, out of which 34.0% had children under the age of 18 living with them, 48.1% were married couples living together, 12.7% had a female householder with no husband present, and 34.0% were non-families. 30.6% of all households were made up of individuals, and 15.3% had someone living alone who was 65 years of age or older. The average household size was 2.41 and the average family size was 2.99.

In the city, the population was spread out, with 26.6% under the age of 18, 9.0% from 18 to 24, 26.1% from 25 to 44, 24.7% from 45 to 64, and 13.6% who were 65 years of age or older. The median age was 36 years. For every 100 females, there were 87.5 males. For every 100 females age 18 and over, there were 87.7 males.

The median income for a household in the city was $21,806, and the median income for a family was $28,750. Males had a median income of $30,577 versus $20,000 for females. The per capita income for the city was $13,049. About 22.0% of families and 28.1% of the population were below the poverty line, including 36.6% of those under age 18 and 16.8% of those age 65 or over.

Education
 Zavalla is served by the Zavalla Independent School District and home to the Zavalla High School Eagles.

Notable people

 Dustin Ellermann, winner of Season 3 of the shooting competition show Top Shot
 Arthur Hawkins, Captain, U.S. Navy's 10th leading ace with 14 aerial victories in WW II

References

External links
 Handbook of Texas article about Zavalla

Cities in Angelina County, Texas
Cities in Texas